Tamás Egerszegi (born 2 August 1991) is a Hungarian footballer  who plays as a midfielder for III. Kerületi TVE in  Nemzeti Bajnokság II.

Honours
Diósgyőr
Hungarian League Cup (1): 2013–14

Club statistics

Updated to games played as of 24 June 2020.

References

External links
 Player profile at HLSZ 
 Tamás Egerszegi at Soccerway

1991 births
Living people
Hungarian footballers
Association football midfielders
Újpest FC players
BFC Siófok players
Sint-Truidense V.V. players
Gyirmót FC Győr players
Diósgyőri VTK players
Mezőkövesdi SE footballers
Miedź Legnica players
Vasas SC players
Paksi FC players
Budapest Honvéd FC players
Nemzeti Bajnokság I players
I liga players
Hungarian expatriate footballers
Expatriate footballers in Belgium
Expatriate footballers in Poland
Hungarian expatriate sportspeople in Belgium
Hungarian expatriate sportspeople in Poland
Sportspeople from Pest County